Surviving Twin is a Netflix special featuring Loudon Wainwright III, released on November 13, 2018.

References

External links
 

2018 television specials
Netflix specials